This is the List of municipalities in Amasya Province, Turkey .

References 

Amasya
Populated places in Amasya Province